Penpol may refer to several places in Cornwall, England:
 Penpol Creek (River Fowey), a creek in St Veep parish
 Penpol, Feock, a hamlet on Penpol Creek, in Feock parish
 Penpol, Lesnewth, a listed building
 Higher Penpol, Middle Penpol and Lower Penpol, hamlets in St Veep parish

See also
 Penpoll a farm in the parish of Quethiock